The women's heptathlon event at the 1983 Pan American Games was held in Caracas, Venezuela on 24 and 25 August. It was the first time that this event was held at the Games replacing the pentathlon.

Results

References

Athletics at the 1983 Pan American Games
1983